Eternal Silence, alternatively known as the Dexter Graves Monument or the Statue of Death, is a monument in Chicago's Graceland Cemetery and features a bronze sculpture set upon, and backdropped by, black granite. It was created by American sculptor Lorado Taft in 1909.

History
The monument commemorates Dexter Graves, who in 1831 led a group of thirteen families from Ohio to settle in Chicago. Graves died in 1844, 75 years before the statue's creation and 16 years before Graceland Cemetery was founded. His body was presumably relocated from its original resting place at the old City Cemetery (the present site of Lincoln Park). The will of Graves' son Henry, who died in 1907, provided $250,000 in funds for the monument and another $40,000 intended to commemorate Henry's favorite race horse, Ike Cook. The Cook monument was to stand alongside a drinking fountain for horses in Washington Park. The horse monument never materialized, despite the construction of a model; instead, in 1920, another Taft piece, Fountain of Time, was built in its place and features a hooded figure similar to the one in Eternal Silence.

Ada Bartlett Taft's 1946 book Lorado Taft; Sculptor and Citizen lists Eternal Silence as one of the artist's most important works. Images of Eternal Silence have been used in other artworks, including those by Claes Oldenburg. One folktale claims that looking into the eyes of the statue's hooded figure causes the viewer to see a vision of his or her own death.

Design

Eternal Silence has been called "eerie", "somber", "grim-looking", "mysterious", and "haunting". The black granite provides contrast for the bronze statue, which is heavily oxidized because of its age. The cemetery used to shine the statue to return its true bronze patina but received many complaints and requests to return it to its more dramatic green sheen; the cemetery now keeps the statue in its preferred oxidized state. The hooded figure was influenced by Taft's own "ideas on death and silence". Historically speaking, the figure in Eternal Silence is related to the sculpted funeral procession around the Tomb of Philip the Bold in Dijon, France and the Adams Memorial by Augustus Saint-Gaudens in Washington, D.C. The statue is considered famous and has been noted as Graceland Cemetery's most "unforgettable" monument. The monument was designed by Taft and cast by Jules Bercham. On its base, Taft inscribed the north side with his signature; the south side is inscribed with Am. Art Bronze Foundry J. Bercham -Chicago-. The monument falls within Art Nouveau style.

See also
Black Hawk Statue
 List of public art in Chicago
The Crusader
Fountain of Time

Notes

References
Kiefer, Charles D., Achilles, Rolf, and Vogel, Neil A. "Graceland Cemetery" (pdf), National Register of Historic Places Registration Form, HAARGIS Database, Illinois Historic Preservation Agency, June 18, 2000, accessed October 8, 2011.

Sculptures by Lorado Taft
Outdoor sculptures in Chicago
Personifications of death
Graceland Cemetery
1909 sculptures
Bronze sculptures in Illinois
Historic district contributing properties in Illinois
Art Nouveau sculptures and memorials
Art Nouveau architecture in Chicago
Statues in Chicago
1909 establishments in Illinois
National Register of Historic Places in Chicago